NBA rebounding leader may refer to:
List of National Basketball Association annual rebounding leaders
List of National Basketball Association career rebounding leaders
List of National Basketball Association career playoff rebounding leaders
List of National Basketball Association single-game rebounding leaders
List of National Basketball Association rookie single-season rebounding leaders
List of National Basketball Association single-season rebounding leaders